Jeffrey Lynn Goldblum (born October 22, 1952) is an American actor and musician. He has starred in some of the highest-grossing films of his era, such as Jurassic Park (1993) and Independence Day (1996), as well as their sequels. 

Goldblum made his acting film debut in Death Wish (1974) with early roles in California Split (1974), Nashville (1975), and Annie Hall (1977). He gained wider attention for his roles in Invasion of the Body Snatchers (1978), The Big Chill (1983), and The Fly (1986). In 1996 he received an Academy Award for Best Live Action Short Film nomination for Little Surprises.

His career had a resurgence with his roles in the Wes Anderson films The Life Aquatic with Steve Zissou (2004), The Grand Budapest Hotel (2014), and Isle of Dogs (2018). He's also known for his role as Grandmaster in the Marvel Cinematic Universe (MCU) films Guardians of the Galaxy Vol. 2 and Thor: Ragnarok (both in 2017) as well as the Disney+ series What If...? (2021). 

He has also appeared in several TV series, including Will & Grace, for which he received a Primetime Emmy Award for Outstanding Guest Actor in a Comedy Series nomination. He also appeared in Friends, Portlandia, and Inside Amy Schumer. He currently hosts his own series The World According to Jeff Goldblum (2019-present). His jazz band released their first album, The Capitol Studios Sessions, in 2018.

Early life
Jeffrey Lynn Goldblum was born to Jewish parents in West Homestead, Pennsylvania, located just outside of Pittsburgh. His mother, Shirley Jane Goldblum (née Temeles; October 30, 1926 – January 9, 2012), was a radio broadcaster who later ran a kitchen equipment and appliances sales firm; his father, Harold Leonard Goldblum (April 25, 1920 – February 23, 1983), was a physician and major in the U.S. Army during World War II. His family is from Russia and the Austro-Hungarian Empire, with roots in Starobin and Zolochiv. He has a sister, Pamela, and an elder brother, Lee. His other brother, Rick, whom Goldblum has described as a "kind of hero of mine", died in 1971 at age 23 while travelling in Morocco, having contracted dysentery which led to kidney failure. Goldblum credits his interest in jazz music to Rick's influence while they were growing up. He has stated that his brother's early death made him "more focused" and gave him a determination to "save myself and survive".

During his childhood, Goldblum attended an Orthodox synagogue and had a bar mitzvah ceremony. His family also celebrated Christmas, and he was raised to believe in Santa Claus. His parents were interested in show business. His father nearly studied acting before deciding to pursue medical studies, going on to become chief of medicine at a Pittsburgh hospital. Goldblum moved to New York City at 17 to become an actor. He worked on the stage and studied acting at the renowned Neighborhood Playhouse under the guidance of acting coach Sanford Meisner. He made his Broadway debut in the Tony Award-winning musical Two Gentlemen of Verona. He is an accomplished jazz pianist.

Career

Goldblum made his film debut as a home-invading thug in the 1974 Charles Bronson film Death Wish. He briefly appeared as a protester in the TV movie Columbo: A Case of Immunity (1975). He has a brief part as a party guest in Annie Hall (1977); Goldblum is seen speaking into a telephone at a Hollywood party, "This is Mr. Davis. I forgot my mantra."

Goldblum starred as comedian Ernie Kovacs in the 1984 TV movie, "Ernie Kovacs: Between the Laughter."  The movie dealt with the real-life kidnapping of Kovacs' two daughters by his former first wife. Actress Edie Adams, Kovacs' second wife and his widow, made a cameo appearance in the well-received movie.

Goldblum has had leading roles in films such as The Fly (1986), Jurassic Park (1993), Earth Girls Are Easy (1989), The Tall Guy (1989), Vibes (1988), Into the Night (1985) and The Lost World: Jurassic Park (1997).

Goldblum's supporting roles include Invasion of the Body Snatchers (1978), The Big Chill (1983), The Adventures of Buckaroo Banzai Across the Eighth Dimension (1984), Independence Day (1996), and Igby Goes Down (2002), as well as the Wes Anderson films The Life Aquatic with Steve Zissou (2004) and The Grand Budapest Hotel (2014).

For several years in the 1990s, Goldblum was the voice for most U.S. Apple commercials, including advertisements for the iMac and iBook. He also voices some U.S. Toyota commercials as well as Procter & Gamble's facial cream line. He has appeared on Irish TV in a commercial for the National Lottery filmed in 2003.

Goldblum taught acting at Playhouse West in North Hollywood with Robert Carnegie. It was with several actors from this acting company that he improvised and directed the live action short film Little Surprises, which was nominated for an Academy Award in 1996.

Goldblum played the role of Adam in Adam Resurrected, a film adaptation of the Yoram Kaniuk novel about a former German entertainer who becomes the ringleader to a group of Holocaust survivors in an asylum after World War II.

He made a guest appearance on Sesame Street in 1990 as Bob's long-lost brother Minneapolis (parody of Indiana Jones), in a sketch where Big Bird's friend Snuffleupagus had "the golden cabbage of Snuffertiti" hidden in his cave. He has appeared on Tom Goes to the Mayor, The Colbert Report, Tim and Eric Awesome Show Great Job! and Portlandia.

In September 2006, it was announced that Goldblum was one of the founding members of a new theater company in New York called The Fire Dept.

Goldblum replaced Chris Noth as a senior detective on Law & Order: Criminal Intent. In the series, Goldblum plays Detective Zack Nichols. In August 2010, media outlets reported that Goldblum had decided not to return to Criminal Intent due to persistent concerns about the program's future.

In 2014, Goldblum's jazz band, The Mildred Snitzer Orchestra, did a weekly show at the Carlyle Hotel. Also in 2014, he appeared in an episode of Last Week Tonight parodying his role in Law & Order. In 2016, he reprised his role of David Levinson in Independence Day: Resurgence, the sequel to Roland Emmerich's 1996 alien invasion/disaster film Independence Day.

In November 2015, he joined the ensemble cast of Shane Carruth's third film The Modern Ocean. Goldblum played The Grandmaster in the Marvel superhero film Thor: Ragnarok (2017). He reprised his role as Dr. Ian Malcolm in Jurassic World: Fallen Kingdom (2018) and Jurassic World Dominion (2022); with these films, Goldblum tied with BD Wong for the most appearances out of all the cast members in the franchise.

On May 29, 2018, Billboard reported that he had been signed by Decca Records to record a studio album for release later in the year. The Capitol Studios Sessions, the debut by his jazz band Jeff Goldblum & The Mildred Snitzer Orchestra, duly appeared on November 9, 2018. This was followed a year later by I Shouldn’t Be Telling You This, with the band having played Glastonbury that summer.

In July 2018, a 25 ft (7.6m) statue of Goldblum was erected next to London's Tower Bridge as a temporary installation in order to mark 25 years since the release of Jurassic Park. At Disney's D23 Expo in 2019, Disney announced the show The World According to Jeff Goldblum would feature Goldblum and be available at the launch of the Disney+ streaming service on November 12, 2019.

Goldblum was the subject of the 2021 biography Because He's Jeff Goldblum (Penguin Random House), written by Washington Post features writer Travis M. Andrews. In October 2022, it was reported that Goldblum was in final talks to play the Wizard in the two-part film adaptation of the musical, Wicked. His role in the film was confirmed on December 8, 2022.

Personal life
From 1980 to 1985, Goldblum was married to Patricia Gaul, with whom he appeared in Silverado (1985). From 1987 to 1991, he was married to Geena Davis, his co-star in Transylvania 6-5000 (1985), The Fly (1986), and Earth Girls Are Easy (1988). Geena Davis filed for divorce in October 1990, and it was finalized the following year.

In mid-2014, Goldblum became engaged to Emilie Livingston, a Canadian Olympic rhythmic gymnast 30 years his junior; the couple married on November 8, 2014. Their first child, a son, was born on July 4, 2015. Their second son was born on April 7, 2017.

Filmography

Film

Television

Video games

Theatre

Discography
Jeff Goldblum & The Mildred Snitzer Orchestra
 Studio albums 

 Compilation appearances

Awards and nominations

References

External links

 
 
 
 
 Interview with Goldblum from New York Magazine (April 2005)

1952 births
20th-century American Jews
20th-century American male actors
21st-century American Jews
21st-century American male actors
21st-century American male musicians
21st-century American pianists
American jazz pianists
American male film actors
American male jazz musicians
American male pianists
American male stage actors
American male television actors
American male video game actors
American male voice actors
American Orthodox Jews
American people of Austrian-Jewish descent
American people of Russian-Jewish descent
Apple Inc. advertising
Decca Records artists
Jazz musicians from Pennsylvania
Jewish American male actors
Jewish American musicians
Jewish singers
Living people
Male actors from Pennsylvania
Neighborhood Playhouse School of the Theatre alumni
People from Homestead, Pennsylvania